Sandehi is a 1954 Indian Malayalam-language film, directed and produced by F. Nagoor. The film stars Muthukulam Raghavan Pillai and T. R. Omana. The film had musical score by T. R. Pappa.

Cast
 S. P. Pillai
 Muthukulam Raghavan Pilla
 T. R. Omana
 Santhadevi
 M. G. Chakrapani
 Neyyaattinkara Komalam

References

External links
 

1954 films
1950s Malayalam-language films
Films scored by T. R. Pappa